Pitusa is a chain of department stores operating in Puerto Rico. It is one of the largest Puerto Rican store companies and one of Topeka's main competitors.

History
The first Pitusa store was opened in 1977 by owner Israel Kopel. The inaugural store was opened just in time for that year's Christmas season, opening on December 2. In 2017, Pitusa is the 4th most visited furniture store on the island.

From 1997 to 2012, the store chain's operations grew into a $150,000,000 dollar a year operation.

In 2014, Pitusa had 4000 employees.

In 2017, Pitusa adopted new labor laws that allowed them to reduce employees' overtime wages.

References

External links
 

Companies of Puerto Rico
Retail companies established in 1977
Puerto Rican brands
1977 establishments in Puerto Rico